Théodore Antoine Louis Jourdan (29 July 1833, Salon-de-Provence3 January 1908, Marseille) was a French painter of rural genre scenes.

Biography 
His debut came at the Exposition Marseillaise of 1859 with "Une visite à Nazareth".

After 1865, he exhibited at the Salon in Paris. In 1879, he was awarded a gold medal at the Sydney International Exhibition. 

He taught at his alma-mater, the École, from 1874 to 1903. His paintings were mostly created in the pastoral areas of Provence.

He bequeathed nineteen large works and numerous drawings to his native village, Salon-de-Provence, in exchange for a lifetime pension, to be paid to his widow. These paintings are on display in a special gallery at the Musée de Salon et de la Crau.

Gallery

Sources 
 André Alauzen and Laurent Noet, Dictionnaire des peintres et sculpteurs de Provence-Alpes-Côte d'Azur, Jeanne Laffitte, 2006 
 Paul Masson (General ed.), Encyclopédie départementale des Bouches-du-Rhône, Archives départementales des Bouches-du-Rhône, Marseille, 1913-1937, Vol. XI pp.266-267

External links 

1833 births
1908 deaths
19th-century French painters
French genre painters
French landscape painters
Animal painters
People from Salon-de-Provence